Nathaniel Strong was a member of the Wisconsin State Assembly during the 1848 session. Strong represented the 5th District of Rock County, Wisconsin. He was a Democrat.

References

People from Rock County, Wisconsin
Democratic Party members of the Wisconsin State Assembly
Year of birth missing
Year of death missing